Calasanctius Howley (17 June 1848–13 December 1933) was a New Zealand catholic nun and teacher. She was born in Corofin, County Clare, Ireland on 17 June 1848.

References

1848 births
1933 deaths
New Zealand educators
20th-century New Zealand Roman Catholic nuns
People from County Clare
Irish emigrants to New Zealand (before 1923)
19th-century New Zealand Roman Catholic nuns